MD, Md, mD or md may refer to:

Places
 Moldova (ISO country code MD)
 Maryland (US postal abbreviation MD)
 Magdeburg (vehicle plate prefix MD), a city in Germany
 Mödling District (vehicle plate prefix MD), in Lower Austria, Austria

People
 Muhammad (name) or Mohammed (Md)

Arts, entertainment, and media

Music
 Music director
 Mini Disc

Other arts, entertainment, and media
 MDs (TV series), 2002
 , ("Materials and discussions for the analysis of classical texts"), an Italian journal

Brands and enterprises
 Air Madagascar, IATA airline code
 McDonnell Douglas aircraft model prefix
 MD Helicopters

Science and technology

Biology and medicine
 Doctor of Medicine, a medical degree
 Medial dorsal nucleus, a cluster of neurons in the thalamus
 Muscular dystrophy, a group of diseases involving breakdown of skeletal muscles
 Ménière's disease, a disorder of the inner ear
 MD (Ayurveda), a degree in Indian medicine

Computing
 .md, Internet top-level domain for Moldova
 Markdown (file extension .md), a format
 Microdrive, a type of miniature hard drive
 mkdir or md, "make directory" command
 Multiple device, as in Linux mdadm device driver
 Sega Genesis or Mega Drive, a video game console

Other uses in science and technology
 Mean absolute difference
 Mendelevium, symbol Md, a chemical element
 Mesoscale discussion in Storm Prediction Centerssand Weather Prediction Centers
 Methyldichloroarsine, a chemical warfare agent
 Millidarcy (mD), a unit of fluid permeability
 Molecular dynamics
 Membrane distillation
 Earthquake duration magnitude

Other uses
 MD, 1500 in Roman numerals
 Majority decision, in full-contact combat sports
 Managing director, of a company
 Marque déposée or trademark in Canada in Unicode subscripts and superscripts
 Match Director in International Practical Shooting Confederation match
 Military districts of Russia, sometimes abbreviated as MD
 MDMA, sometimes abbreviated as MD